This is a list of schools in Salem district, Tamil Nadu.

Schools

Government Boys Higher Secondary School, Thiruvelviyur (a) Belur
Government Girls Higher Secondary School, Thiruvelviyur (a) Belur
 Government boys higher secondary school, Gangavalli
 Aerokids International Preschool, Elampillai
 AGN Matriculation and Higher Secondary School, Konganapuram
 Acharya Higher Secondary school, Poolampatti Road, Edappadi
 Acharya Primary school, Poolampatti Road, Edappadi
 Acharya Pre-Primary school, Poolampatti Road, Edappadi
 Amala Matriculation and Higher Secondary School, Morasapatti
 Bala Bharathi Matriculation Higher Secondary School
 Bharathi Matriculation Higher Secondary School, Thammampatti
 Bharathi Vidya Mandir Matriculation School, Aaragalur
 Bharathi Vidyalaya Higher Secondary School, Maravaneri
 Bharat Matriculation Higher Secondary School, Vinyagapuram, Attur, Salem
 BHARAT International Schools, NH-79, P.G.Palayam, Attur, Salem
 Christopher Matriculation Higher Secondary School, Panamarathupatti(Website:http://christopherschools.org/)
 Christopher Nursery and Primary School, Dadagapatti (Website:http://christopherschools.org/)
 Classic Matriculation School - Siruvachur, Attur
 Cluny Matriculation Higher Secondary School
 C.S.I. Higher Secondary School, Shevapet
 C.S.I. Matriculation High School, Shevapet
 Chinmaya Vidyalaya Matriculation School, Sollampallam, Salem
 Diamond Rays Matriculation Higher Secondary School
 Emerald Valley Public school
 Glaze Brooke Matriculation Higher Secondary School, Reddiyur
 Gokulanatha Hindu Mahajana Higher Secondary School
 Golden Choice Matriculation Higher Secondary School
 Golden Gates Matriculation Higher Secondary School
 Golden Spark Matriculation Higher Secondary School
 Government Boys Higher Secondary School, Attur
 Government Boys Higher Secondary School, Vazhapadi
 Government Girls Higher Secondary School, veeraganur
 Government Boys Higher Secondary School, Salem, near Salem corporation building
 Government Girls Higher Secondary School, near Valluvar statue
 Greenpark Matric Higher Secondary School, Attur
 Government Boys Higher Secondary School, Mettur Dam
 Government Boys Higher Secondary School, Thammapatty
 Gugai Higher Secondary School, Line Medu
 Gugai Matriculation Higher School, Line Medu
 G.V. Higher Secondary School, Mettur Dam
 Holy Angels Matriculation Higher Secondary School
 Holy Angels' Public School, Fairlands
 Holy Cross International School
 Holy Cross Matriculation Higher Secondary School
 Holy Flower Matriculation Higher Secondary School
 Jairam Public School (CBSE), Chinnathirupathi, Salem-8
 Jay Matriculation Higher Secondary school, Ponnamapet
 Jayam Academy (CBSE) School, Samiyarkinaru, Near Attur
 Jayam Matric School, Samiyarkinaru, Near Attur
 Jayarani matriculation hr.sec school, Nethimedu
 Jothi Matriculation Higher Secondary School, Ammapet
 Kailash Maansarovar School
 Kamaraja Educational Trust Thedavoor
 The Little Flower Higher Secondary School, 4-Roads, Salem
 Little Flower Matriculation School
 Malco Vidyalaya Matriculation Higher Secondary School, Mettur Dam
 MAM Higher Secondary and Matriculation School, Mettur Dam
 Maruthi Higher Secondary School, Manivizhundan (South), Attur
 MALAR Matric Hr. Sec. School, Attur,Salem
 Montfort Higher Secondary School, Yercaud
 Municipal Boys Higher Secondary School, Ammapet
 Municipal Girls Higher Secondary School, Ammapet
 Neelambal Subramaniam Matric Hr. Sec. School, Old Suramangalam, Salem
 Notre Dame of Holy cross school
 National matric higher secondary school, Annaiyampatti
 Prapavathy Matriculation School, Karumandurai, Salem
 Raj Matriculation Higher Secondary School, P.G. Palayam, Attur
 Sabari School of Excellence, Deevattipatti 
 Saraswathi Matriculation School, Ulipuram
 Saraswathi Matric Higher Secondary School, Attur
 Sengunthar Matric Higher Secondary School, Sanyasigundu, Salem.
 Shevaroy's Valley School, Vazhavandhi, Yercaud, Salem.
 SHY Higher Secondary School, Yercard
 Sindhi Hindu high school, Narayana Nagar
 Sourashtra High School
 sri Ragavendra Matric Higher Secondary School. Veeraganur
 Sri SRV Matriculation Higher Secondary School
 Sri Saradha Bala Mandhir Higher Secondary School
 Sri Saradha Vidyalaya Girls Higher Secondary School
 Sri Venkateswara Matriculation and Higher Secondary School, Thalaivasal Po, Attur, Salem
 Sri Vidya Mandir Higher Secondary School [CBSE], Anandasramam, Meyyanur
 Sri Vidya Mandir Senior Secondary School [CBSE], Shivaji Nagar,  Ammapet
 Sri Vidya Mandir Higher Secondary School [CBSE], Ayodhiappattanam
 Sri Vidya Mandir Secondary School [CBSE], Kondalampatty
 Sri Vidya Mandir Secondary School [CBSE], Shevapet
 Sri Vidya Mandir Higher Secondary School, Attayampatty
 Sri Vidya Mandir Anglo-Indian Matriculation Higher Secondary School,(CBSE & MATRIC),Salem Steel plant
 SRK Matriculation Higher Secondary School
 SSRM Higher Secondary School, Karupur
 St. John's Matriculation Higher Secondary School
 St. Joseph's Matriculation Higher Secondary School, Line Medu
 St. Mary's Girls Higher Secondary School
 St. Mary's Higher Secondary School, A.N.Mangalam, Karipatty (VIA)
 St. Mary's Higher Secondary School, Arisipalayam
 St. Mary's Matriculation School, Arisipalayam
 St. Mary's Matriculation School, Vellandivalasu, Edappadi
 St. Paul's Higher Secondary School, Salem.
 Tagore Matriculation Higher Secondary School, Attur
 Tippu Islamiya Matriculation School,Salem
 Universal Matriculation Higher Secondary School, Edappadi
 Vaanivikas matric Higher Secondary School, Kothambadi, Attur
 Vanavani Vidyalaya Matriculation School, Neykkarapatti, Salem
 Vaigai Matriculation Higher Secondary School, Vazhapadi
 Vasavi Higher Secondary School, Shevapet
 Vasavi Matriculation School, Shevapet
 Vedhha Vikass Matriculation and Higher Secondary School, Santhiyur
 Wisdom Matriculation Higher Secondary School, Edappadi
 Yuva Bharathi Matriculation School, Maravenari
 S.K.T Matric Higher Secondary School, Poolampatty
 Government Higher Secondary School, Mettupatty
 Velasamy Chettiar Higher Secondary School, Omalur
 Wisdom Gates Matric Higher Secondary School, Velagouanur Omalur.

Salem
Education in Salem district